Craig Kelly (born 1963) is an Australian politician.

Other people include:

 Craig Kelly (snowboarder) (1966–2003), American former snowboarder
 Craig Kelly (footballer) (born 1966), Australian former AFL footballer
 Craig Kelly (actor) (born 1970), British actor
 Craig A. Kelly (born 1953), American diplomat

See also 
 Kelly Craig, Canadian model and actress